Gilaki may possibly refer to:
Gilaks, an adjective for an ethnic group in Iran province of Gilan
Gilaki language, a language spoken by a group of Gilani people in Iran's Gīlān Province

See also 
 Gilani, linked to or from Gilan